Saint-Pierre-de-Manneville is a commune in the Seine-Maritime department in the Normandy region in northern France.

Geography

Heraldry

Population

Places of interest
 The church of St. Pierre, dating from the sixteenth century.
 The chapel at Villiers, dating from the eighteenth century.
 The nineteenth-century chateau of BelleGarde.
 The manorhouse at Villers, built in timber and dating from the sixteenth century.
 Two mansions.

See also
Communes of the Seine-Maritime department

References

External links

Official website of Saint-Pierre-de-Manneville 

Communes of Seine-Maritime